Elizabeth Henrietta may refer to: 

Elizabeth Henrietta (1816) a brig that was lost in 1825.
Elisabeth Henriette of Hesse-Kassel, the daughter of William VI, Landgrave of Hesse-Kassel and Hedwig Sophia of Brandenburg.
Elizabeth Henrietta, the wife of Governor Lachlan Macquarie.
Elizabeth Henrietta Torlesse, a notable New Zealand homemaker and community leader.